The Rehearsal is a 1974 film produced by Jules Dassin that is a cinematographic indictment of the Greek military junta of 1967–1974.

Cast
Jules Dassin
Olympia Dukakis
Stathis Giallelis
Lillian Hellman
Melina Mercouri
Arthur Miller
Laurence Olivier
Giorgos Panoussopoulos
Maximilian Schell
Mikis Theodorakis
Michael Mullins
Jerry Zafer
Stephen Diacrussi

External links

1974 films
British multilingual films
Greek multilingual films
1970s multilingual films
1970s English-language films
English-language Greek films
1970s Greek-language films
Films directed by Jules Dassin
1974 drama films
Works about the Greek junta
Films scored by Mikis Theodorakis